Ammunition Igloo (also known as Building 88) was a bunker used for arms storage at Camp George West, Golden, Colorado.  It was built in 1940 of stone, supported by a soil-covered concrete arch.  Rubble masonry, built of basalt, was used for the parapet-equipped facade.

It was listed on the National Register of Historic Places in 1993.

See also
National Register of Historic Places listings in Jefferson County, Colorado

References

External links
Colorado Office of Archaeology and Historic Preservation

Armories on the National Register of Historic Places in Colorado
Buildings and structures in Golden, Colorado
Magazines (artillery)
Fortifications in the United States
National Register of Historic Places in Jefferson County, Colorado
Infrastructure completed in 1940
1940 establishments in Colorado